Lisa Jane Persky (born May 5, 1955) is an American actress, journalist, author, artist, and photographer. She played supporting roles in the films The Great Santini (1979) Peggy Sue Got Married (1986) and When Harry Met Sally... (1989), and worked in the late 1970s as a writer and photojournalist for New York Rocker magazine.

Early life and education 
After her parents' divorce, her father, Mordecai (Mort) Persky, married novelist Judith Rossner (Looking for Mr. Goodbar), and her mother, Jane Holley Persky, married classical violinist Vladimir Weisman. Persky grew up in New York City's Greenwich Village at 87 Christopher Street, a building known for notable tenants such as H.M. Koutoukas and Yoko Ono. She attended P.S. 41 for elementary school then the High School of Art and Design, where she studied graphic design.

Acting 
Immediately after she graduated from high school, Persky's neighbor Koutoukas, a playwright, told her that he had written a play for her. He cast her, with the salary of $25 per week, as "Cordelia Wells, The World's Most Perfect Teenager" in Grandmother Is in the Strawberry Patch. The play was produced at La MaMa Experimental Theatre Club, and was the first of several collaborations between Persky and Koutoukas. In 1976, she performed as Mary-Eleanor in Tom Eyen's Women Behind Bars, directed by Ron Link and starring Divine.

She has since appeared in many plays, including on Broadway in Steaming, and has received critical acclaim for her stage performances in Los Angeles. She received the Drama-Logue and LA Weekly Theater awards (for Best Actress) for Mayo Simon's These Men, in which she starred at the Los Angeles Actors Theatre Company and for Hearts on Fire at the Odyssey. She also received a Drama Critics Circle award nomination (for Outstanding Performance) for These Men.

Her breakout performance as a film actress came in 1979 playing the role of Robert Duvall's daughter in The Great Santini. She has acted in over two dozen films, including American Pop, The Cotton Club, Peggy Sue Got Married, The Big Easy, When Harry Met Sally..., and Coneheads. In her role as Katrina in Destiny Turns on the Radio (1995), she gave actor/director Quentin Tarantino his first on-screen kiss. In 2013, she appeared in I Am Divine, Jeffrey Schwarz's documentary about the actor Divine.

Persky's television work has included a recurring role on Private Eye as well as appearances on NYPD Blue, The X-Files, King of the Hill, E/R, The Golden Girls, and dozens more. She has appeared in made-for-TV movies such as Meat Loaf: To Hell and Back and KISS Meets the Phantom of the Park.

Writing and editing 
An early participant in the CBGB music scene, she was a founding staff member at New York Rocker magazine. During that era, she documented the burgeoning punk and new wave movement as a writer and a photojournalist. She revisited the era on the "New York Rockers" panel at the 2012 EMP Pop Conference.

As a journalist, her work has appeared in publications including Fortean Times and LA Weekly. In 2010, she became a founding editor of the Los Angeles Review of Books, where she was also art director. She left the publication in December 2012.

Her fiction has appeared, among other places, in the magazines BOMB and Eclectica (where, billed as Eljay Persky, she was one of 30 writers selected to be anthologized in its Eclectica: Best Fiction Vol. 1 collection).

Visual art 
In addition to her fine-art photography, her photography has been featured in magazines such as Mojo, Q, and Uncut, and in books, including Gary Valentine's memoir, New York Rocker: My Life in The Blank Generation, Punk: The Whole Story, and Lance Out Loud, to which she also contributed an essay. Her collage work has appeared in publications including the Los Angeles Times and LA Style, and it earned her an Award for Design Excellence from Print magazine. In 2008, she co-produced and curated Los Angeles Loteria; An Exploration of Identity, an edition of prints in honor of the 40th anniversary of Aardvark Letterpress. In 2012, she contributed the foreword to the catalog for photographer Bobby Grossman's exhibit Low Fidelity - The Photos of Bobby Grossman.

Personal life and miscellaneous appearances 
On January 19, 2008, she married Andy Zax, a music historian and former co-star of the Comedy Central game show Beat the Geeks.

Persky was the subject of "(I'm Always Touched by Your) Presence, Dear", a song by Blondie. The song was written by her then-boyfriend Gary Valentine, who was the band's bassist at the time.

In 2009, Persky began making appearances on The Best Show on WFMU radio program, as both a regular caller and as an in-studio special guest. She is also a semi-regular on the Life Elsewhere program on WMNF in Tampa, Florida.

Persky occasionally has appeared at fan conventions, including the 20th anniversary celebration for Quantum Leap and at the 2013 New York/New Jersey KISS Expo.

Filmography

Film

Television

References

External links
Lisa Jane Persky's personal blog
Lisa Jane Persky's photography website

Persky's page on La MaMa Archives Digital Collections

1955 births
Living people
Actresses from Atlanta
Actresses from New York City
American film actresses
American television actresses
American photographers
American women journalists
People from Greenwich Village
High School of Art and Design alumni
21st-century American women
American women photographers